Augusta Dorothea of Brunswick-Wolfenbüttel (16 December 1666 in Wolfenbüttel – 11 July 1751 at Augustenburg Castle in Arnstadt) was a daughter of the Duke Anthony Ulrich of Brunswick-Wolfenbüttel and his wife Juliane of Holstein-Norburg.

Life 
Auguste Dorothea married on 7 August 1684 in Wolfenbüttel to Count Anton Günther II of Schwarzburg-Sondershausen.  He was elevated to Imperial Prince in 1697.  The couple resided in Arnstadt; the marriage remained childless.

Auguste Dorothea survived her husband by 35 years. She spent her long widowhood at Augustenburg Castle in Arnstadt, building her famous dolls collection .  These dolls were never intended as toys; they represent society in the style of a baroque Cabinet of curiosities.  Augustenburg castle no longer exists; her doll collection has been moved to the New Palace in Arnstadt.

References 
Apfelstedt, Börner, and Donhof: Heimathskunde für die Bewohner des Fürstenthums Schwarzburg-Sondershausen, part 3: Geschichte des Fürstlich-Schwarzburgischen Hauses, 1856, reprinted May 1998
Friedrich Apfelstedt: Das Haus Kevernburg-Schwarzburg von seinem Ursprunge bis auf unsere Zeit, Arnstadt, 1890, 
Matthias Klein and Carola Müller Die Puppenstadt im Schlossmuseum zu Arnstadt, German text with English summary, 3rd ed., Königstein im Taunus, 1999,

External links 
 Virtual tour through the Mon Plaisir city of dolls

New House of Brunswick
House of Schwarzburg
Princesses of Schwarzburg
1666 births
1751 deaths
People from Arnstadt
17th-century German people
18th-century German people
Daughters of monarchs